Eurowheel is a  tall Ferris wheel at the Mirabilandia amusement park near Ravenna, in Emilia–Romagna, Italy. It is known for its views over Ravenna and nearby beaches, and its 50,000 light bulbs are said to make it the brightest Ferris wheel in the world.

When constructed in 1999, Eurowheel was the tallest extant Ferris wheel in Europe, superseding the  Moscow-850.

Both the  Great Wheel, built for the Empire of India Exhibition at Earls Court, London, in 1895, and the  Grande Roue de Paris, built for the Exposition Universelle of 1900 in Paris, were taller, however the London wheel was demolished in 1907 and the Paris wheel in 1920.

Eurowheel is now Europe's second tallest extant Ferris wheel, after the  London Eye, which officially opened on 31 December 1999, but which did not open to the public until March 2000 because of technical problems.

Eurowheel has a  minimum passenger height restriction.

References

External links
Theme Park Review: Mirabilandia Euro Wheel
 Official Mirabilandia website

Ferris wheels
Buildings and structures in the Province of Ravenna
Tourist attractions in Emilia-Romagna